The Usoi Dam is a natural landslide dam along the Murghab River in Tajikistan. The dam was created on February 18, 1911, when the 7.4-Ms Sarez earthquake caused a massive landslide that blocked the flow of the river.

It is named after the village of Usoi, which was completely buried by the 1911 landslide.

The basin formed by Usoi Dam now holds Sarez Lake, a -long lake holding  of water.  Water does not flow over the top of the dam, which would quickly cause it to erode away; instead, water seeps out of the base of the dam at a rate which approximately matches the rate of inflow, maintaining the lake at a relatively constant level. The level thus only rise an average of 20 cm per years. The flow averages about 45 cubic meters per second, with an annual variation of 35-80 cubic meters per second and dissipates about 250 megawatts.

Geologists are concerned that the Usoi Dam may become unstable during future large-magnitude earthquakes, which are relatively common in the seismically active Pamirs, and might collapse due to liquefaction or subsequent landslides during such an event.  Collapse of the dam would unleash a locally catastrophic flood. The Murghab's river valley tends to be relatively narrow and steep.  This would focus and maintain any flood's destructive power as it swept through the valley of the Murghob District.

The dam wall survived a localised 7.2 magnitude earthquake, the 2015 Tajikistan earthquake, on the 7th December 2015 with no visible signs of deterioration.

References

External links
Map of the Usoi Dam – Sarez Lake, Scale 1:110'000
Map of Gorno-Badakhshan region of Tajikistan
Sarez, Rogun, Aral

Dams in Tajikistan
Lakes of Tajikistan
Gorno-Badakhshan Autonomous Region
Landslides in Tajikistan
Landslide-dammed lakes
Landslides in 1911